"Can U Get wit It" is the first single from American recording artist Usher's self-titled debut album, Usher (1994). Written and produced by DeVante Swing of Jodeci, the single peaked at number 59 on the US Billboard Hot 100 and number 87 on the UK Singles Chart.

Track listings
US vinyl, 12-inch
 "Can U Get wit It" (extended edit) – 6:58
 "Can U Get wit It" (album version) – 4:56
 "Can U Get wit It" (instrumental – album version) – 4:58
 "Can U Get wit It" (TV track) – 5:00

Charts

Weekly charts

Year-end charts

Release history

References

1994 singles
1994 songs
Arista Records singles
LaFace Records singles
Song recordings produced by DeVante Swing
Songs written by DeVante Swing
Usher (musician) songs